Hezaran may refer to:
 Hezaran-e Olya
 Hezaran-e Sofla